NFTO Pro Cycling were a British UCI Continental cycling team, until October 2016. According to the team's website, 'NFTO' stands for 'Not For The Ordinary'.

Founded in 2014 the team were planning to become a UCI Professional Continental team in 2016. However this change of status did not occur, and in October of that year it was announced that the team's sponsor would cease to support the team, and that the team's manager Tom Barras would set up a successor team with UCI Continental status. In December Barras confirmed that the new team would not race after the squad's prospective sponsor pulled out.

Major wins

2014
Prudential RideLondon, Adam Blythe
Overall Totnes - Vire, James Lewis
Stage 1, James Lewis
 Overall Tour Series Sprint classification, Jon Mould
Stoke-on-Trent, Jon Mould
Sprints classification, Jon Mould 
Durham, Jon Mould
Sprints classification, Jon Mould 
Edinburgh, Jon Mould
Sprints classification, Jon Mould 
Woking Sprints classification, Jon Mould
Otley Criterium (Elite Circuit Series), Adam Blythe
Grand Prix of Poland Points race, Jon Mould
Stockton GP, Russell Downing
2015
Jock Wadley Memorial Road Race, Steele Von Hoff
Stage 4 Tour Down Under, Steele Von Hoff 
Duncan Sparrow Road Race, Tom Barras
Capernwray Road Race, Ian Bibby
Rutland–Melton CiCLE Classic, Steele Von Hoff 
Chorley GP, Ian Bibby
Stage 6 Rás Tailteann, Ian Bibby

National champions
2014
 British National Circuit Championships, Adam Blythe
2015
 Australian National Criterium Championships, Steele Von Hoff

Team roster

References

Cycling teams based in the United Kingdom
UCI Continental Teams (Europe)
Cycling teams established in 2014
2014 establishments in the United Kingdom
Defunct cycling teams based in the United Kingdom
Cycling teams disestablished in 2016
2016 disestablishments in the United Kingdom